Ulick Canning de Burgh, Lord Dunkellin (12 July 1827 – 16 August 1867) was an Anglo-Irish soldier and politician who served during the Crimean War and was Military Secretary to the Viceroy of India and MP for Galway Borough (1857–65) and County Galway (1865–67).

A statue was erected to him in Eyre Square, Galway in 1873 in honour of his military career, and political career as MP for Galway Borough and County Galway. However, the statue was torn down after Irish independence in 1922, partly on account of his brother Hubert de Burgh-Canning who was a notoriously unpopular landlord in County Galway.

Background
Dunkellin was the eldest son of Ulick de Burgh, 1st Marquess of Clanricarde, and the Hon. Harriet, daughter of George Canning. He was educated at Eton.

Military career
Dunkellin was a Lieutenant-Colonel in the Coldstream Guards. He was Aide-de-Camp to the Lord Lieutenant of Ireland (Lord Bessborough and then Lord Clarendon) between 1846 and 1852 and State Steward to the Lord Lieutenant (Lord St Germans) between 1852 and 1854. He then served in the Crimean War and was taken prisoner during the Siege of Sevastopol. In 1856, Dunkellin was Military Secretary to the Viceroy of India, his uncle Lord Canning.

Political career
Dunkellin also sat as Member of Parliament for Galway Borough between 1857 and 1865 and County Galway between 1865 and 1867. Prominent as an Adullamite, he moved the amendment on the Parliamentary Reform Bill on 18 June 1866, which later led to the fall of the government of Earl Russell.

Personal life
After years of ill health, Lord Dunkellin died in London in August 1867, aged 40, predeceasing his father by seven years. He never married. His younger brother Hubert later succeeded in the marquessate.

Arms

Ancestry

References

External links 

Burgh, Lord Dunkellin, Ulick de
1827 births
1867 deaths
People educated at Eton College
Members of the Parliament of the United Kingdom for County Galway constituencies (1801–1922)
UK MPs 1857–1859
UK MPs 1859–1865
UK MPs 1865–1868
Heirs apparent who never acceded
Ulick
British courtesy barons and lords of Parliament